Alfred Hill may refer to:

 Alfred John Hill (1862–1927), British railway engineer
 Alfred Hill (cricketer, born 1865) (1865–1936), English cricketer
 Alfred Hill (politician) (1867–1945), British Member of Parliament for Leicester West 1922–1923
 Alfred Hill (composer) (1869–1960), Australian composer and conductor
 Alfred Hill (cricketer, born 1887) (1887–1959), English cricketer
 Alfred Hill (bishop) (1901–1969), Anglican bishop of Melanesia
 Alfred Hill (Benny Hill, 1924–1992), British comedian

See also
 Al Hill (disambiguation)
 Hill (surname)